Drahomír Koudelka (26 May 1946 – 19 August 1992) was a Czech volleyball player who competed for Czechoslovakia in the 1968 Summer Olympics, in the 1972 Summer Olympics, and in the 1976 Summer Olympics.

He was born in Krasová, Blansko District.

In 1968, he was part of the Czechoslovak team which won the bronze medal in the Olympic tournament. He played all nine matches.

Four years later, he finished sixth with the Czechoslovak team in the 1972 Olympic tournament. He played six matches.

At the 1976 Games, he was a member of the Czechoslovak team which finished fifth in the Olympic tournament. He played all six matches.

External links
 
 

1946 births
1992 deaths
Czech men's volleyball players
Czechoslovak men's volleyball players
Olympic volleyball players of Czechoslovakia
Volleyball players at the 1968 Summer Olympics
Volleyball players at the 1972 Summer Olympics
Volleyball players at the 1976 Summer Olympics
Olympic bronze medalists for Czechoslovakia
Olympic medalists in volleyball
Medalists at the 1968 Summer Olympics